Irazú Volcano National Park, or in Spanish the , is a National Park in the Central Conservation Area of Costa Rica that encompasses the area around the Irazú Volcano in Cartago Province which incorporates what used to be the Ruben Torres Rojas Forest Reserve now called the Prusia Forest Reserve. The volcano is still active although the last major eruptions were between 1963 and 1965, with occasional minor eruptions and some small lava flows since that time.

The park is the site of a reforestation project to restore the area which was destroyed by the eruptions. The forest is made up of conifers and other exotic and native species and also a native forest consisting mainly of oaks and alder, protecting the watershed of the Reventado River.

The Crater Principal lake has an unusual greenish yellow coloring caused by rainfall dissolving the minerals along the craters walls. It has also been known to change colour to rust-red depending on the minerals present. The inactive, dry Diego de la Haya crater is just to the East of the Crater Principal and is filled with volcanic ash.

External links 
 Irazú Volcano National Park at Costa Rica National Parks

National parks of Costa Rica
Protected areas established in 1955
Geography of Cartago Province
Tourist attractions in Cartago Province
1955 establishments in Costa Rica